The Valea de la Lazuri (also: Leuca) is a river in Romania, a right tributary of the Crișul Alb. It flows into the Crișul Alb in Vârfurile.

References

Rivers of Romania
Rivers of Arad County